This page is a list of final matches for the National Football League (NFL), an annual Gaelic football tournament played by the GAA county teams of Ireland, and some teams from outside Ireland.

Below is a list of all NFL finals (or NFL champions for those seasons in which no final was played). The letters AI  indicate the county went on to win the All-Ireland Senior Football Championship that year. In the past NFL has been a poor predictor of summer form: only 26.6% (21/79) of League winners have gone on to become All-Ireland champions. However, since the re–formatting of the competition in 2002, the winner of the national league has more regularly gone on to win the All–Ireland on nine out of sixteen occasions: Tyrone (once) in 2003, Kerry (thrice) in 2004, 2006 and 2009, Cork (once) in 2010 and Dublin (four times) in 2013, 2015, 2016 and 2018.

List of finals

1925–26 – Laois 2–1 Dublin 1–0
1926–27 – League not held
1927–28 – Kerry 2–4 Kildare 1–6
1928–29 – AI Kerry 1–7 Kildare 2–3
1929–30 – League not held
1930–31 – AI Kerry 1–3 Cavan 1–2
1931–32 – AI Kerry 5–2 Cork 3–3
1932–33 – Meath 0–10 Cavan 1–6
1933–34 – Mayo 2–4 Dublin 1–5
1934–35 – Mayo 5–8 Fermanagh 2000–2
1935–36 – AI Mayo were champions with 12 points from eight games
1936–37 – Mayo 5–4 Meath 1–8
1937–38 – Mayo 3–9 Wexford 1–3
1938–39 – Mayo 5–9 Meath 0–6
1939–40 – Galway 2–5 Meath 1–5
1940–41 – Mayo 3–7 Dublin 0–7
1941–45 – League suspended for four seasons
1945–46 – Meath 2–2 Wexford 0–6
1946–47 – Derry 2–9 Clare 2–5
1947–48 – AI Cavan 5–9 Cork 2–8 (replay)
1948–49 – Mayo 1–8 Louth 1–6
1949–50 – New York 2-8 Cavan 0-12 (Home final:Cavan 2–8 Meath 1–6
1950–51 – Meath 0–6 Mayo 0–3
1951–52 – Cork 1–12 New York 0–3 (Home final: Cork 2–3 Dublin 1–5)
1952–53 – Dublin 4–6 Cavan 0–9
1953–54 – Mayo 2–10 Carlow 0–3
1954–55 – Dublin 2–12 Meath 1–3
1955–56 – Cork 0–8 Meath 0–7
1956–57 – Galway 1–8 Kerry 0–6
1957–58 – AI Dublin 3–13 Kildare 3–8
1958–59 – AI Kerry 2–8 Derry 1–8
1959–60 – AI Down 0–12 Cavan 0–9
1960–61 – Kerry 4–16 Derry 1–5
1961–62 – Down 2–5 Dublin 1–7
1962–63 – Kerry 1–18 New York 1–10 (Home final: Kerry 0–9 Down 1–5)
1963–64 – New York 2–12 Dublin 1–13 (Home final: Dublin 2–9 Down 0–7)
1964–65 – AI Galway 4–12 New York 0–17 (two-legged final; home final: Galway 1–7 Kerry 0–8)
1965–66 – Longford 1–18 New York 0–17 (two-legged final; home final: Longford 0–9 Galway 0–8)
1966–67 – New York 7–8 Galway 1–16 (two-legged final; home final: Galway 0–12 Dublin 1–7)
1967–68 – AI Down 2–14 Kildare 2–11
1968–69 – AI Kerry 2–33 New York 2–24 (two-legged final; home final: Kerry 3–11 Offaly 0–8)
1969–70 – Mayo 4–7 Down 0–10
1970–71 – Kerry 0–11 Mayo 0–8
1971–72 – Kerry 2–11 Mayo 1–9
1972–73 – Kerry 2–12 Offaly 0–14
1973–74 – Kerry 0–14 Roscommon 0–8 (replay)
1974–75 – Meath 0–16 Dublin 1–9
1975–76 – AI Dublin 2–10 Derry 0–15
1976–77 – Kerry 1–8 Dublin 1–6
1977–78 – Dublin 2–18 Mayo 2–13
1978–79 – Roscommon 0–15 Cork 1–3
1979–80 – Cork 0–11 Kerry 0–10
1980–81 – Galway 1–11 Roscommon 1–3
1981–82 – Kerry 1–9 Cork 0–5 (replay)
1982–83 – Down 1–8 Armagh 0–8
1983–84 – AI Kerry 1–11 Galway 0–11
1984–85 – Monaghan 1–11 Armagh 0–9
1985-86 – Laois 2–6 Monaghan 2–5
1986-87 – Dublin 1–11 Kerry 0–11
1987-88 – AI Meath 2–13 Dublin 0–11 (replay)
1988-89 – AI Cork 0–15 Dublin 0–12
1989-90 – Meath 2–7 Down 0–11
1990-91 – Dublin 1–9 Kildare 0–10
1991-92 – Derry 1–10 Tyrone 1–8
1992-93 – Dublin 0–10 Donegal 0–6 (replay)
1993-94 – Meath 2–11 Armagh 0–8
1994-95 – Derry 0–12 Donegal 0–8
1995-96 – Derry 1–16 Donegal 1–9
1996-97 – AI Kerry 3–7 Cork 1–8
1997-98 – Offaly 0–9 Derry 0–7
1998-99 – Cork 0–12 Dublin 1–7
1999–2000 – Derry 1–8 Meath 0–9
2000–01 – Mayo 0–13 Galway 0–12
2002 – Tyrone 0–15 Cavan 0–7
2003 – AI Tyrone 0–21 Laois 1–8
2004 – AI Kerry 3–11 Galway 1–16
2005 – Armagh 1–21 Wexford 1–14
2006 – AI Kerry 2–11 Galway 0–11
2007 – Donegal 0–13 Mayo 0–10
2008 – Derry 2–13 Kerry 2–9
2009 – AI Kerry 1–15 Derry 0–15
2010 – AI Cork 1–17 Mayo 0–12
2011 – Cork 0-21 Dublin 2-14
2012 – Cork 2-10 Mayo 0-11
2013 – AI Dublin 0-18 Tyrone 0-17
2014 – Dublin 3-19 Derry 1-10
2015 – AI Dublin 1-21 Cork 2-7
2016 – AI Dublin 2-18 Kerry 0-13
2017 – Kerry 0–20 Dublin 1–16
2018 – AI Dublin 0–18 Galway 0–14
2019 – Mayo 3-11 Kerry 2-10
2020 – Kerry Round–Robin  Dublin
2021 – Dublin and Kerry and shared title, final not played
2022 - AI Kerry 3-19 Mayo 0-13

See also
 List of All-Ireland Senior Football Championship finals
 NFL Game

References

External links
 "Five FL finals worth looking at again", Hogan Stand, 7 April 2021

League Finals
Finals